The 2017 Milo Open Cali was a professional tennis tournament played on clay courts. It was the tenth edition of the tournament which was part of the 2017 ATP Challenger Tour. It took place in Cali, Colombia between 16 and 21 October 2017.

Singles main-draw entrants

Seeds

1 Rankings as of 9 October 2017.

Other entrants
The following players received wildcards into the singles main draw:
  Charles Force
  Alejandro González
  Cristian Rodríguez
  Luis Valero

The following players received entry from the qualifying draw:
  Gonzalo Lama
  Juan Ignacio Londero
  Daniel Muñoz de la Nava
  Mario Vilella Martínez

Champions

Singles

  Federico Delbonis def.  Guilherme Clezar 7–6(12–10), 7–5.

Doubles

  Marcelo Arévalo /  Miguel Ángel Reyes-Varela def.  Sergio Galdós /  Fabrício Neis 6–3, 6–4.

References

Milo Open Cali
Seguros Bolívar Open Cali
2017 in Colombian tennis